The Anguilla Football Association is the governing body of football in Anguilla.

Association staff

References

External links
 Anguilla at the FIFA website.
  at CONCACAF website

Anguilla
Football in Anguilla
Sports organizations established in 1990
1990 establishments in Anguilla